HostPapa is a Canadian-based privately owned web hosting company that provides shared, reseller, and virtual private server (VPS) hosting. It operates in Canada, United States, United Kingdom, Australia, Germany, New Zealand, Mexico, Singapore, India, Hong Kong, European Union, France, Ireland, Belgium and Spain.
In 2016 the company provided hosting services to more than 180,000 websites.

History
HostPapa entered the dedicated and hosted applications market in 2002, and began offering web hosting services to customers in 2005, through its first registered domain. It was officially founded in Canada by Jamie Opalchuk in 2006.  In its promotional material, HostPapa committed to using green energy. In 2010 HostPapa was accredited by the Better Business Bureau.

The current company logo, including the "Papa" character, was the result of a 2012 "Who's Your Papa?" logo design contest.

In June 2012, HostPapa partnered with Cloudflare, a website performance optimization company. Also in 2012, HostPapa announced a partnership with SiteLock Website Security.

In 2013, 2015 and 2015, HostPapa appeared on the PROFIT 500 ranking of Canada’s fastest-growing companies based on five-year revenue growth.  On February 9, 2015, Dropmysite announced multi-language partnership with HostPapa.

HostPapa has received several awards since the company was founded, including Uptime Awards from NCM Online and WHTop.

Acquisitions 
 In 2020, HostPapa purchased 9 other hosting companies, including Korax, Lunarpages, PacificHost, Santa Barbara Hosting and Canvas Host. 
 In 2020, they purchased Data Deposit Box, a provider of cloud backup and recovery technology.
 In April 2021, they purchased Silicon Valley Web Hosting from Denetron LLC.
 In July 2021, HostPapa acquired UptimeMate, keeping it as a standalone solution while also intending to offer it as a part of their PapaCare+ plan.
 In March 2022, HostPapa acquired the Californian company, Cloud 9 Hosting.

Infrastructure
HostPapa has web hosting infrastructure, including Hewlett-Packard hardware and servers, networked by Cisco equipment, in various tier one data centers in Canada and around the world. The company operates North American-based call centers for customer support in English, French, and Spanish.  Its hosting services use Sucuri server software and CloudProxy.

The company uses MailChannels SMTP relay anti-spam technology to analyze outbound email behaviour in order to limit unwanted emails and ensure email delivery to its customers.  Customers use cPanel control panel to access HostPapa's web hosting software.

HostPapa uses 100% renewable energy to power data centers, web servers, office computers, laptops, and office spaces, limiting its carbon emissions. In July 2017 CEO Jamie Opalchuk said  the company plans  to broaden its data center coverage with servers in the United States, United Kingdom, and Australia.

Services
HostPapa offers several shared website hosting plans which provide unlimited domains and subdomains, with 500 to 1000MB limited individual email, MySQL, cPanel access, and private name services. In 2015, PC Magazine pointed out that, unlike some of its competitors, HostPapa did not offer dedicated or managed WordPress hosting.

Incidents

On May 7, 2015, Fergal Gallagher from Tech Times reported a worldwide hacking issue that endangered millions of websites. WordPress software (content management system) vulnerabilities could have allowed hackers to gain control of websites using the default theme and plug-in if the website owner or administrator clicked on a malicious link.  At the time of publication, major web hosts, including HostPapa, had already fixed the vulnerability.

Philanthropy
In 2011, through the Love Trees charity, HostPapa donated 10,000 trees  in Africa for Earth Day. HostPapa was given the Love Trees Partnership award of Merit. That year, HostPapa held a promotion in which it donated $5 to Save the Elephants for every GoDaddy customer who transferred to HostPapa.

References

External links
HostPapa - Canada
HostPapa - USA

Technology companies established in 2006
Web hosting
Email
Internet technology companies of Canada